The 2013 Parramatta Eels season was the 67th in the club's history. Coached by Ricky Stuart and captained by Jarryd Hayne, Reni Maitua and Tim Mannah, they competed in the NRL's 2013 Telstra Premiership.

Summary
Another wooden spoon followed in 2013, with the club suffering their second biggest loss ever (4–64 to Melbourne in Round 24), and conceding three other scores of 50 or more.  On 12 September 2013 it was announced Ricky Stuart would leave the Eels to take up the head coaching role at Canberra for the 2014 season.

Standings

National Rugby League

National Youth Competition

Fixtures

Pre-season

Home and away season

Players and staff

Note: Junior Paulo, Kaysa Pritchard, Kelepi Tanginoa and Vai Toutai were still eligible to play in the Holden Cup for the 2013 season

Transfers

In:

Out:

Retirees:
 Nathan Hindmarsh
 Luke Burt
 Casey McGuire

Representative call ups

Domestic

International

References 

Parramatta Eels seasons
Parramatta Eels season